Leslie "Les" Hirst (birth unknown) is a former professional rugby league footballer who played in the 1940s and 1950s.

Playing career

County Cup Final appearances
Les Hirst played right-, i.e. number 3, in Wakefield Trinity's 17-3 victory over Keighley in the 1951 Yorkshire County Cup Final during the 1951–52 season at Fartown Ground, Huddersfield on Saturday 27 October 1951.

Club career
Les Hirst made his début for Wakefield Trinity during November 1949, he scored 107-goals in the 1951–52 Northern Rugby Football League season, and 103-goals in the 1953–54 Northern Rugby Football League season, he appears to have scored no drop-goals (or field-goals as they are currently known in Australasia), but prior to the 1974–75 season all goals, whether; conversions, penalties, or drop-goals, scored 2-points, consequently prior to this date drop-goals were often not explicitly documented, therefore '0' drop-goals may indicate drop-goals not recorded, rather than no drop-goals scored.

References

External links

Search for "Hirst" at rugbyleagueproject.org

Living people
English rugby league players
Place of birth missing (living people)
Rugby league centres
Rugby league fullbacks
Wakefield Trinity players
Year of birth missing (living people)